An antitragus piercing is a perforation of the outer ear cartilage for the purpose of inserting and wearing a piece of jewelry. It is placed in the antitragus, a piece of cartilage opposite the ear canal. Overall, the piercing has characteristics similar to the tragus piercing; the piercings are performed and cared for in much the same way.

Healing 
This piercing, like most cartilage piercings, can take anywhere from 8 to 16 months to fully heal. The piercing should be cleaned daily until healed. The most common way to clean it using sea salt water or another saline solution. The jewelry should not be changed until the piercing has healed.

References

Ear piercing

ru:Пирсинг ушей#Пирсинг противокозелка